Jaslyk Prison was a detention facility in Karakalpakstan in north-west Uzbekistan where human rights activists and ex-inmates alleged that torture was widespread. Former prisoners include Muzafar Avazov, who was apparently boiled to death.

The prison, officially known by the codename UYA 64/71, was located in a former Soviet military base once used for testing chemical warfare protection equipment. It was established in 1999. The prison was opened to contain thousands of people arrested following bombings in the capital, Tashkent, and as of 2012 held 5,000–7,000 people according to Human Rights Watch.

The prison was shut down by Uzbekistan's president, Shavkat Mirziyoyev, in September 2019.

References

External links
IWPR report 
Human Rights Watch report 

Prisons in Uzbekistan
Closed military installations
Military installations of the Soviet Union
1999 establishments in Uzbekistan
Military installations with year of closure missing
Soviet chemical weapons program